Jordan D. Teuscher is an American attorney and politician serving as a member of the Utah House of Representatives from the 42nd district. Elected in November 2020, he assumed office on January 1, 2021.

Early life and education 
Teuscher was born in Salt Lake City and graduated from Riverton High School. He earned a Bachelor of Arts degree in political science and philosophy from Brigham Young University and a Juris Doctor from the J. Reuben Clark Law School.

Career 
Since graduating from law school, Teuscher has worked as an attorney. He completed an externship with the Area Legal Counsel of the Church of Jesus Christ of Latter-day Saints in Kyiv, Ukraine. He was also the executive director of the Leavitt Institute for International Development and worked for the International Center for Law and Religion Studies. Teuscher was elected to the Utah House of Representatives in November 2020 and assumed office on January 1, 2021.

Political career
During the 2022 General Session, Teuscher served on the Business, Economic Development, and Labor Appropriations Subcommittee, the House Business and Labor Committee
House Ethics Committee, and the House Political Subdivisions Committee.

In 2022, Representative Teuscher proposed HB 234, which would require transparency and notice requirements for local education agencies and schools regarding curricula, class syllabi, and associated learning materials used for student instruction. This bill would also require schools to make learning materials to be made available and updated online with descriptions of associated learning materials for parent inspection. After receiving pushback from local educators and an online petition opposing the bill with more than 30,000 signatures, Teuscher dropped the bill for the 2022 Legislative Session.

2022 Legislation
HB0091S02	Financial Disclosures Amendments, HB0111S01	Court-appointed Therapists Amendments, HB0139S02	Traffic Violation Amendments, HB0183	In-person Learning Amendments, HB0218S01	Citizen Petition Amendments, HB0218S04	Ballot Measure Amendments,   HB0234S01	Public Educator Curriculum Transparency Requirements, HB0318	Dental Provider Malpractice Amendments, HB0329	Weapon Possession Penalty Amendments, HB0335S02	Blockchain and Digital Innovation Task Force, HB0339	Paid Teacher Preparation Days for Curriculum and Classroom Transparency, HB0342	Contact Lens Purchase Amendments, HB0356S02	Athletic Coaching Standards Amendments, HB0422S01	School District Voter Eligibility Amendments, HB0433	Attorney General Authority Amendments, HB0456	Virtual Currency Payment Amendments, HB0456S03	Digital User Asset Payment Amendments, HB0470	Higher Education Residency Amendments, HB0472	County Council Amendments, HB0487	Education False Claims Amendments,  HCR005	Concurrent Resolution Condemning the Undemocratic Government of Venezuela

References 

Living people
People from Salt Lake City
Politicians from Salt Lake City
Brigham Young University alumni
J. Reuben Clark Law School alumni
Republican Party members of the Utah House of Representatives
Utah lawyers
21st-century American politicians
Year of birth missing (living people)